Pingtung may refer to:

 Pingtung City, the capital of Pingtung County, Taiwan
 Pingtung County, a county of Taiwan

See also
 Pingdong (disambiguation)
 Pingtung Plain, a plain in Pingtung and Kaohsiung in Taiwan
 Pingtung Airport (ICAO code: RCSQ ; IATA code: PIF), an airport with two airfields in Pingtung, Taiwan
 Pingtung Station, a rail station in Pingtung, Taiwan
 Pingtung Line, a rail line from Kaouhsiung to Pingtung in Taiwan
 Pingtung Baseball Field
 Tung Ping Chau (Tung Ping Island), in Hong Kong
 Ping (disambiguation)
 Tung (disambiguation)